The athletics competition at the All-Africa University Games has featured at all editions since the first in 1975. It was set for a tenth edition in 2020, but this was postponed due to the COVID-19 pandemic. The competition has an upper age limit of 25 years and only formal university students may compete.

The competition began with two events in the 1970s before having a relaunch in 2004. A reduced programme of only men's events were held during the 2004 edition.

Editions

Men's champions

100 metres
1975: 
1979: 
2004:

200 metres
1975: 
1979: 
2004:

400 metres
1975: 
1979: 
2004:

800 metres
1975: 
1979: 
2004:

1500 metres
1975: 
1979: 
2004:

5000 metres
1975: 
1979:

10,000 metres
1979:

3000 metres steeplechase
1979:

110 metres hurdles
1975: 
1979: 
2004:

400 metres hurdles
1975: 
1979: 
2004:

High jump
1975: 
1979:

Pole vault
1975: 
1979:

Long jump
1975: 
1979: 
2004:

Triple jump
1975: 
1979:

Shot put
1975: 
1979:

Discus throw
1975: 
1979:

Javelin throw
1975: 
1979:

4 × 100 metres relay
1975: 
1979: 
2004:

4 × 400 metres relay
1975: 
1979:

Women's champions

100 metres
1975: 
1979:

200 metres
1975: 
1979:

400 metres
1975: 
1979:

800 metres
1975: 
1979:

100 metres hurdles
1975: 
1979:

High jump
1975: 
1979:

Long jump
1975: 
1979:

Shot put
1975: 
1979:

Discus throw
1975: 
1979:

Javelin throw
1975: 
1979:

4 × 100 metres relay
1975: 
1979:

4 × 400 metres relay
1979:

References

Champions
All-Africa University Games. GBR Athletics. Retrieved 2021-01-21.

University Games
All-Africa University Games
All-Africa University Games